The Agreement Concerning Cooperation in the Exploration and Use of Outer Space for Peaceful Purposes was an agreement between the United States of America (U.S.A) and the Union of Soviet Socialist Republics (U.S.S.R) which established a legal framework for the Apollo-Soyuz Test Project (ASTP) and refined the means and methods for sharing data between these two parties. It was written in the days leading up to May 24, 1972, and signed by U.S. President Richard Nixon and U.S.S.R. Premier A. N. Kosygin in Moscow. This agreement was of particular significance as it furthered efforts towards cooperation in space between U.S. and the U.S.S.R. during the Cold War.

Key points 
The Agreement enumerates areas in which the U.S. and the U.S.S.R. would cooperate, notably exploration, space meteorology, environmental sciences, celestial bodies, and space medicine. It describes the means to accomplish these goals, listing among other things, "delegations [and] meetings of scientists and specialists of both countries."

It also broadly outlines the goals and time frame of the ASTP, stating that "[t]he parties have agreed to carry out projects for developing compatible rendezvous and docking systems [...] in order to enhance the safety of manned flight in space and to provide the opportunity for conducting joint scientific experiments." The agreement gives a tentative date and method for the implementation of the mission, describing "the docking of a United States Apollo-type spacecraft and a Soviet Soyuz-type spacecraft with visits of astronauts in each other's spacecraft."

Though the Soviets wanted to include clauses concerning communication satellites, the State Department could not agree to this as the United States' government does not control this industry.

Background and history 
Though the Americans shrouded preliminary efforts to draft this agreement in secrecy to the point that it was being treated as "semi-clandestine," the Soviets had no such reservations; indeed, NASA officials found news of one of their upcoming meetings on the front page of the New York Times.

In The Partnership: A History of the Apollo-Soyuz Test Project by Edward C. Ezell and his wife, Linda Newman Ezell, the agreement's inception is narrated: the U.S.S.R only shared its drafts "a week before the Summit", leading to frantic scrambling on the part of the U.S. State Department to finish theirs, working "until the middle of the night."

U.S. President Nixon and U.S.S.R. Premier Kosygin signed the Agreement at 6:00 p.m. Moscow time on July 24, 1972.

References 

Space exploration
Apollo program
Soyuz program
1972 in the United States
1972 in the Soviet Union
History of the United Nations
Apollo–Soyuz Test Project
Soviet Union–United States treaties
Space treaties